Hortensio Fernández Extravis, also known as Tensi, was a Spanish former footballer who played as a centre-back. He played for 14 years for Real Oviedo.

He is the third most capped player has worn the shirt of Oviedo. Tensi also captained the club for many years.

See also
List of one-club men

References

1946 births
2011 deaths
People from Langreo
Spanish footballers
Real Oviedo players
Footballers from Asturias
Association football defenders